Buthus montanus is a scorpion species found in the mountain ranges of southeastern Spain.

References 

Buthidae
Animals described in 2004
Scorpions of Europe
Fauna of Spain